HyperCam is a screencasting program made and created by Hyperionics and Solveig Multimedia. It captures the action from a Microsoft Windows screen and saves it to an AVI (Audio Video Interleaved) or WMV (Windows Media Video) or ASF (Advanced Systems Format) movie file. HyperCam will also record all sound output, and sound from the system microphone can also be recorded.

Features 
HyperCam is primarily intended for creating software presentations, tutorials, demonstrations, walkthroughs, and other various tasks the user wants to demonstrate. The latest versions also capture overlay video and can re-record movies and video clips (e.g. recording videos playing in Windows Media Player, RealVideo, QuickTime, etc.). Beginning with version 3.0, HyperCam also includes a built-in editor for trimming and merging captured AVI, WMV, ASF files.

The unregistered versions of HyperCam 1, HyperCam 2 and HyperCam 3 apply a digital watermark to the upper-left corner of each recorded file and will ask the user to register on every startup. Base registration, which costs $39.95, will eliminate this watermark.

Hyperionics has now made HyperCam 2 a permanent free download for "worldwide use".

Presence in Internet culture 

In the early days of YouTube, HyperCam 2's unregistered version became widely used among amateur videographers due to it being free and having a significantly small watermark. This has caused it to become popular as a representation of YouTube's past, with "Unregistered HyperCam 2" becoming a staple in nostalgia-based internet culture.

HyperCam 2 also made an appearance on Reddit's social experiment, Place in April of 2017.

See also
 Comparison of screencasting software
 009 Sound System#YouTube

References

External links
  HyperCam 6 Official site
  HyperCam 2 Official site
  HyperCam Support Forum
Know Your Meme

Screencasting software
Internet memes
1997 software